Falsomordellistena is a genus of tumbling flower beetles in the family Mordellidae, containing the following species:

 Falsomordellistena alpigena Tokeji, 1953
 Falsomordellistena altestrigata (Marseul, 1876)
 Falsomordellistena auriguttata Nomura, 1951
 Falsomordellistena aurofasciata (Nakane, 1949)
 Falsomordellistena aurosuturalis Nomura, 1967 g
 Falsomordellistena awana Kôno
 Falsomordellistena ayahime Nomura, 1967
 Falsomordellistena baishanzuna Fan, 1995
 Falsomordellistena bihamata (Melsheimer, 1845) i c g b
 Falsomordellistena brasiliensis Ermisch, 1950
 Falsomordellistena bruneiensis Chûjô, 1964
 Falsomordellistena discolor (Melsheimer, 1845) i c g b
 Falsomordellistena eocenica Kubisz, 2003
 Falsomordellistena formosana (Píc, 1911)
 Falsomordellistena hebraica (LeConte, 1862) i c g b
 Falsomordellistena hiranoi g
 Falsomordellistena hirasana Shiyake, 1996
 Falsomordellistena humerosignata Nomura, 1967
 Falsomordellistena inouei Nomura, 1951
 Falsomordellistena kleckai Horak, 2005 g
 Falsomordellistena konoi g
 Falsomordellistena loochooana Nomura, 1964
 Falsomordellistena nipponica Nomura, 1957
 Falsomordellistena parca Tokeji, 1953
 Falsomordellistena pseudalpigena Nomura, 1975
 Falsomordellistena pubescens (Fabricius, 1798) i c g b
 Falsomordellistena rosseolloides Nomura, 1975
 Falsomordellistena sauteri (Píc, 1926)
 Falsomordellistena shinanomensis Tokeji, 1953
 Falsomordellistena shirozui Chûjô, 1957
 Falsomordellistena tokarana Nakane, 1956
 Falsomordellistena vagevittata Nakane, 1957
 Falsomordellistena watanabei Nomura, 1975
 Falsomordellistena wui Fan & Yang, 1995

Data sources: i = ITIS, c = Catalogue of Life, g = GBIF, b = Bugguide.net

References

Mordellidae